Dumitru Radu Popescu (19 August 1935 – 2 January 2023) was a Romanian novelist, poet, dramatist, essayist and short story writer. He was a corresponding member of the Romanian Academy and was, between 1980 and 1990, Chairman of the Romanian Writers' Union.

His 1973 novel Vînatoarea Regală ("The Royal Hunt") was translated into English in 1988. His works have been described as "magical realism" and compared with those of Italo Calvino.

Biography
Born in Păușa village, Nojorid (Bihor County), he attended the University of Medicine and Pharmacy in Cluj, but left before completing his studies. Later, he studied at Babeș-Bolyai University (Faculty of Philology). He then worked as a reporter for the literary magazine , from 1956 to 1969, and served as editor of  magazine, from 1969 to 1982. From 1982 he was editor-in-chief of Contemporanul. Since 2006, he has been the General Manager of the Romanian Academy's publishing house.

Popescu received the Prize of the Romanian Writers' Union on five occasions (in 1964, 1969, 1974, 1977 and 1980), and the Prize of the Romanian Academy in 1970.

In addition to his literary activities, beginning in 1968, he was a substitute member of the Central Committee of the Romanian Communist Party and was elected to the Great National Assembly in 1975. From 1979 to 1989, he was a full member of the committee.

In 1983, one of his books was in the middle of a fight between a Romanian review, România Literară, and a Russian one, Literaturnaya Gazeta. For the Russians, his book about life after the war was too dark.

Death
Popescu died on 2 January 2023, at the age of 87.

Works

Novels
Zilele Saptămânii ("Weekdays", 1959)
Vara Oltenilor ("The Oltenians' Summer", 1964)
F (1969)
Vînatoarea Regală ("The Royal Hunt", 1973)  
O bere pentru calul meu ("A Beer for my Horse", 1974)
Ploile de Dincolo de Vreme ("Rains Beyond Time", 1976)
Împaratul Norilor ("Emperor of the Clouds", 1976)
Iepurele șchiop ("The Lame Rabbit", 1980)
Oraşul îngerilor ("The Angels' City", 1985)

Short story collections
Fuga ("Flight", 1958)
Fata de la Miazăzi ("A Girl from the South", 1964)
Somnul Pamîntului ("The Earth's Sleep", 1965)
Dor ("Longing", 1966)
Umbrela de Soare ("Parasol", 1967)
Prea mic pentru un război așa de mare ("Too Little for Such a Big War", 1969)
Duios Anastasia trecea ("Tenderly Anastasia Passed", 1967)
Leul Albastru ("The Blue Lion", 1981)

Plays
Vara imposibilei iubiri ("The Summer of Impossible Love", 1966)
Vis ("Dream", 1968)
Acești îngeri triști ("Those Sad Angels", 1969)
Pisica în noaptea Anului Nou ("Cat on New Year's Eve", 1970)
Pasărea Shakespeare ("The Shakespeare Bird", 1973)
Rugaciune pentru un disc-jockey ("Pray for a DJ", 1981)
Rezervația de pelicani ("The Pelican Reservation", 1983)

Poems
Câinele de Fosfor ("The Phosphorus Dog", 1981)

Essays
Virgule ("Commas", 1978)

Further reading
 Mirela Roznoveanu, Dumitrui Radu Popescu, Bucharest, Editura Albatros, 1981
 Valentin Tașcu, Dincoace și dincolo de „F”, Cluj, Editura Dacia, 1981
 Marian Popescu, Chei pentru labirint, Bucharest, Editura Cartea Românească, 1986
 Andreea Vlădescu Lupu, Dumitru Radu Popescu, Bucharest, Editura Eminescu, 1987
 Sorin Crișan, Circul lumii la D. R. Popescu, Cluj, Editura Dacia, 2002

References

External links
Information at Romania Online

1935 births
2023 deaths
Babeș-Bolyai University alumni
People from Bihor County
Members of the Great National Assembly
Titular members of the Romanian Academy
Romanian communists
Romanian dramatists and playwrights
Romanian essayists
Romanian magazine editors
Romanian novelists
Romanian male novelists
Romanian poets
Romanian male poets
Romanian male short story writers
Romanian short story writers
Male dramatists and playwrights
Male essayists